Ali Kola or Ali Kala or Alikola may refer to:
 Ali Kola, Amol
 Ali Kola, Juybar
 Ali Kola, Sari